Usora is a municipality located in Zenica-Doboj Canton of the Federation of Bosnia and Herzegovina, an entity of Bosnia and Herzegovina. It borders with Doboj and Tešanj municipality, and it is named after the Usora River.

It was created through secession from Tešanj and Doboj municipalities, during the 1992–95 Bosnian War.

Demographics

Population

Ethnic composition

See also
 Usora (county)
Usora (river)

References

External links 
 Official website

Doboj
Populated places in Usora
Municipalities of Zenica-Doboj Canton
Zenica-Doboj Canton